Splash of color is an effect in film-making.

Splash of color/colour may also refer to:
Splash of Color, Australian TV show hosted by Robert Hagan
Splash of Colour, racehorse which won the 1990 Royal Whip Stakes